Abdul Rahman Shamsid-Deen (born August 1, 1968) is a retired American professional basketball player.

College years
Shamsid-Deen played collegiate basketball for the Providence College Friars, primarily at the center position.

Professional career
Shamsid-Deen was selected by the Seattle SuperSonics in the second round (53rd overall pick) of the 1990 NBA Draft. He never played a game for Seattle, but would go on to play abroad, namely in Spain, Puerto Rico, Germany and Turkey.

References

External links
Hoopedia profile

1968 births
Living people
AEL Limassol B.C. players
American expatriate basketball people in Argentina
American expatriate basketball people in Austria
American expatriate basketball people in Cyprus
American expatriate basketball people in France
American expatriate basketball people in Germany
American expatriate basketball people in Poland
American expatriate basketball people in Spain
American expatriate basketball people in Turkey
American expatriate basketball people in Venezuela
American men's basketball players
Basketball players from New York City
Bayer Giants Leverkusen players
CB Girona players
Centers (basketball)
Club Ourense Baloncesto players
Cocodrilos de Caracas players
Hapoel Galil Elyon players
Leones de Ponce basketball players
Liga ACB players
Maratonistas de Coamo players
Obras Sanitarias basketball players
Paris Racing Basket players
Providence Friars men's basketball players
Ratiopharm Ulm players
Santeros de Aguada basketball players
Seattle SuperSonics draft picks
SIG Basket players
Sportspeople from Staten Island
Traiskirchen Lions players
Ülker G.S.K. basketball players